Diana Orrange (born August 9, 1967) is an American athlete. She competed in the women's triple jump at the 1996 Summer Olympics.

References

External links
 

1967 births
Living people
Athletes (track and field) at the 1996 Summer Olympics
American female triple jumpers
Olympic track and field athletes of the United States
Place of birth missing (living people)
21st-century American women